The Men's EuroHockey Indoor Championship is an international men's indoor hockey competition organized by the European Hockey Federation. The winning team becomes the champion of Europe. The tournament serves as a qualification tournament for the Indoor Hockey World Cup.

The tournament is part of the EuroHockey Indoor Championships and is the highest level in the men's competition. The lowest two teams each year are relegated to the EuroHockey Indoor Championship II and replaced by the highest two teams from that competition. From 2024 onwards the tournament will be played with ten instead of eight teams.

The tournament has been won by three different teams: Germany has the most titles with sixteen, Austria has three titles and Russia has won the tournament once. The most recent edition was held in Hamburg, Germany and was won by Austria.

Results

Summary

* = hosts

Team appearances

See also
Men's EuroHockey Championship
Women's EuroHockey Indoor Championship

References

External links
European Hockey Federation

 
Men 1
Indoor hockey
EuroHockey Indoor Championship
EuroHockey Indoor Championship